Asim Saeed (born 5 October 1979) is a cricketer who played for the United Arab Emirates national cricket team. He played for them in the 1997, 2001 and 2005 versions of the ICC Trophy, as well as in one first-class game in the 2004 ICC Intercontinental Cup. He also played in two One Day Internationals in the 2004 Asia Cup.

External links

1979 births
Living people
People from Al Ain
United Arab Emirates One Day International cricketers
Emirati cricketers
Pakistani expatriate sportspeople in the United Arab Emirates